Titanium white is a family of white pigments composed primarily of titanium dioxide. It is the most widely used white pigment in contemporary artistic applications because of its affordability, low toxicity, and high hiding power. Though the term titanium white most often refers to pigments containing titanium dioxide, it can also describe any white pigment that contains a titanium compound (e.g. zinc titanate, barium titanate, potassium titanate, titanium lithopone, titanium silicate).

History 
The pigment was developed in the 1910s by the Titanium Pigment Company in the United States and the Titan Company in Norway, each working independently. The two manufactures cross-licensed their patents in 1920. By the late 1920s, titanium and zinc white had unseated lead white as the dominant product in the market for white pigment. Most art supply companies now explicitly advise that titanium white should be used instead of lead white for safety reasons.

Visual characteristics 
Titianium white provides greater hiding power and tinting strength than any other white pigment. Titanium white was initially more expensive to produce than lead white, but its superior hiding power soon made it a more economical choice because smaller quantities were required to achieve the same degree of opacity.

Notable occurrences 
Titanium white featured regularly in the palette of Arthur Dove, who was among its earliest adopters in the 1920s. It has also been identified in the work of Thomas Hart Benton, Diego Rivera, Pablo Picasso, and Jackson Pollock.

References 

Inorganic pigments
Pigments
Shades of white